Ching Wah Street is a street in North Point in Hong Kong.  The short, primarily residential, street runs from west to east, parallel to King's Road, at a higher elevation, just behind St. Jude's Church.  It is the location of Kiangsu and Chekiang Primary School and Eng Yu Evangelistic Mission Hong Kong Church.

History
During the 1967 riots, a bomb exploded in Ching Wah Street, killing two young children. It was one of 15 bombs that exploded during the disturbances, which lasted from April to December that year.

See also
 List of streets and roads in Hong Kong

References

Roads on Hong Kong Island